Nuala Ahern (born 5 February 1949 in Omeath, County Louth) is a former Irish Green Party member of the European Parliament representing Leinster in Ireland  from 1994–2004. Ahern became active in politics in 1991 becoming elected to Wicklow County Council. She joined the Green Party in 1989. 

Her involvement in politics began through community action in Wicklow to prevent sewage pollution into the Irish Sea. She is a long-term anti-nuclear campaigner, promoting the use of renewable energy. She grew up in the Cooley peninsula of North County Louth which is close to the plutonium reprocessing plant in Sellafield on the West coast of the UK. She campaigned against the construction of a nuclear power plant in Carnsore Point, County Wexford in the late 1970s and for the closure of Sellafield which still operates today. She campaigned against the use of genetically modified food stating concerns of inadequate scientific knowledge. She has also campaigned against animal testing in the European Union. 

In the European Parliament Ahern was vice-president of the Petitions Committee, vice-president of the Committee on Industry, External Trade, Research & Energy, member of the Culture Committee and Legal Affairs Committee and president of the Intergroup on Complementary and Natural Medicine.

Ahern is founding member of the Irish Women's Environment Network and the Wicklow Greens.

Her father Vincent MacDowell from Newry, is a former councillor and political activist, a former vice chairman of Northern Ireland Civil Rights Association and a representative of the Green Party and the Labour Party.

References

External links

1949 births
Living people
Green Party (Ireland) MEPs
MEPs for the Republic of Ireland 1999–2004
MEPs for the Republic of Ireland 1994–1999
20th-century women MEPs for the Republic of Ireland
21st-century women MEPs for the Republic of Ireland
Local councillors in County Wicklow